Olson Glacier is a tributary glacier descending westward from Malta Plateau to enter Seafarer Glacier, in the Victory Mountains, Victoria Land. Mapped by United States Geological Survey (USGS) from surveys and U.S. Navy air photos, 1960–62. Named by Advisory Committee on Antarctic Names (US-ACAN) for Richard D. Olson of the Office of Antarctic Programs, National Science Foundation, who participated in research administration activities at McMurdo Station, 1967–68.

Glaciers of Victoria Land
Borchgrevink Coast